In Ancient Greece, the Gorgoneion (Greek: Γοργόνειον) was a special apotropaic amulet showing the Gorgon head, used by the Olympian deities Athena and Zeus: both are said to have worn the gorgoneion as a protective pendant, and often are depicted wearing it. It established their descent from earlier deities considered to remain powerful. Among other attributes, it was assumed by rulers of the Hellenistic age as a royal aegis to imply divine birth or protection, as shown, for instance, on the Alexander Mosaic and the Gonzaga Cameo.

Origin

According to Marija Gimbutas, gorgoneia represent certain aspects of the Mother Goddess cult associated with "dynamic life energy" and asserts that the images may be related to a cultural continuity persisting since the Neolithic period defining the gorgoneion as a quintessentially European image. Jane Ellen Harrison, on the other hand, claims that many primitive cultures use similar ritual masks in order to scare the owner from doing something wrong, or, as she terms it, to make an ugly face at the owner: "The ritual object comes first; then the monster is begotten to account for it; then the hero is supplied to account for the slaying of the monster".

Development
Homer refers to the Gorgon on four occasions, each time alluding to the head alone, as if she had no body. Jane Ellen Harrison notes that "Medusa is a head and nothing more [...] a mask with a body later appended". Prior to the fifth century BC, she was depicted as particularly ugly, with a protruding tongue, boar tusks, puffy cheeks, her eyeballs staring fixedly on the viewer and the snakes twisting all around her.

The direct frontal stare, "seemingly looking out from its own iconographical context and directly challenging the viewer", was highly unusual in ancient Greek art. (The common depiction of the evil eye on sixth century drinking vessels, and particularly, eye-cups, like Gorgoneia, are assumed apotropaics.) In some instances, what sometimes appears as a beard (probably standing for stylized hair or streaks of blood) was appended to her chin, making her appear as an orgiastic deity akin to Dionysus.

Gorgoneia that decorate the shields of warriors on mid-fifth century Greek vases are considerably less grotesque and menacing. By that time, the Gorgon had lost her tusks and the snakes were rather stylized. The Hellenistic marble known as the Medusa Rondanini illustrates the Gorgon's eventual transformation into a beautiful woman.

History

Gorgoneia appear frequently in Greek art at the turn of the eighth century BC. One of the earliest representations is on an electrum stater discovered during excavations at Parium. Other early eighth-century examples were found at Tiryns. Going further back into history, there is a similar image from the Knossos palace, datable to the fifteenth century BC. Marija Gimbutas even argues that "the Gorgon extends back to at least 6,000 BC, as a ceramic mask from the Sesklo culture illustrates", and in her book, Language of the Goddess, she also identifies the prototype of the Gorgoneion in Neolithic art motifs, especially in anthropomorphic vases and terracotta masks inlaid with gold.

In the sixth century, gorgoneia of a canonical "lion mask type" were ubiquitous on Greek temples, especially in and around Corinth. Pedimental gorgoneia were common in Sicily; probably the earliest occurrence being in the Temple of Apollo in Syracuse. Around 500 BC, they ceased to be used for the decoration of monumental buildings, but were still shown on antefixes of smaller structures throughout the next century.

Apart from temples, the Gorgon imagery is present on garments, dishes, weapons, and coins found across the Mediterranean region from Etruria to the Black Sea coast. The Gorgon coins were struck in 37 cities, making her image on coins second in numismatic ubiquity only to several principal Olympian deities. On mosaic floors, the gorgoneion usually was depicted next to the threshold, as if guarding it from hostile intruders. On Attic kilns, the gorgoneion over the kiln door protected from mishaps.

The Gorgon imagery remained popular even in Christian times, especially in the Byzantine Empire, including Kievan Rus, and was revived in the West by the Italian Renaissance artists.

More recently, the gorgoneion was adopted by Gianni Versace as a logo for his fashion company.

Gallery

See also
Cultural depictions of Medusa and Gorgons

References

Citations

Sources

Further reading

Amulets
Ancient Greek art
Ancient Greek religion
Anthropology
Symbols of Athena
Iconography
Gorgons
Zeus